Parataygetis is a genus of satyrid butterflies found in the Neotropical realm.

Species
Listed alphabetically:
Parataygetis albinotata (Butler, 1867)
Parataygetis lineata (Godman & Salvin, 1880)

References

Euptychiina
Nymphalidae of South America
Butterfly genera
Taxa named by Walter Forster (entomologist)